The iPad Air (5th generation), colloquially known as the iPad Air 5, is a tablet computer designed, developed, and marketed by Apple Inc. It was announced by Apple on March 8, 2022. Pre-orders began on March 11, 2022, and shipping began on March 18, 2022. It succeeded the 4th generation iPad Air and is available in five colors: Space Gray, Starlight, Pink, Purple, and Blue.

Features

Hardware 
The fifth-generation iPad Air uses the M1 SoC; the same chip used in the iPad Pro (5th generation). The chip has an 8-core CPU, an 8-core GPU and a 16-core Neural Engine which can process more than 11 trillion operations per second. Apple claims the CPU is up to 60 percent faster and the GPU has 2x faster graphics compared to its predecessor. It has 64 GB or 256 GB of internal storage, and 8 GB of RAM.

It has a 10.9-inch 2360 by 1640 Liquid Retina Display display with 3.8 million pixels. The display is laminated and has an anti-reflective coating, as well as wide color, True Tone and 500 nits of brightness.

The fifth-generation iPad Air features a 12 MP rear camera and an ultra-wide 12 MP front camera with Center Stage, which automatically tracks users to keep them in frame. Both cameras have Smart HDR 3.

It has Touch ID integrated into the Sleep/Wake button on the top right edge of the device, and stereo speakers with dual-channel sound in landscape mode.

Connectivity 
The fifth-generation iPad Air includes a USB-C port that is used for charging as well as connecting external devices and accessories. The port is capable of transferring up to 10 Gbit/s (ten billion bits per second, 1.25 GB/s or 1.25 billion bytes per second), allowing for fast connections to cameras and external storage, as well as support for monitors with up to 4K resolution. For wireless connection, the device comes with Bluetooth 5.0 and Wi-Fi 6 (802.11ax) support. Cellular models support sub-6 GHz 5G with peak speeds of up to 3.5 Gbit/s in ideal conditions.

Timeline of iPad models

References 

Air 5
IOS
Tablet computers
Touchscreen portable media players
Tablet computers introduced in 2022